Saying Somethin'! is an album by American saxophonist Gigi Gryce recorded in 1960 for the New Jazz label.

Reception

AllMusic reviewer Scott Yanow awarded the album 4 stars stating "There is more variety than expected and the contrast between Gryce's lyricism and the extroverted nature of Williams's solos make this set fairly memorable."

Track listing
All compositions by Gigi Gryce except as indicated
 "Back Breaker" – 6:08   
 "Leila's Blues" – 6:47   
 "Blues in the Jungle" – 6:16   
 "Down Home" (Curtis Fuller) – 8:19   
 "Let Me Know" (Hank Jones) – 4:43   
 "Jones' Bones" (Jones) – 7:10

Personnel 
Gigi Gryce – alto saxophone 
Richard Williams – trumpet (tracks 1, 2, 4 & 5)
Richard Wyands – piano
Reggie Workman – bass
Mickey Roker – drums

References 

1960 albums
Gigi Gryce albums
New Jazz Records albums
Albums produced by Esmond Edwards
Albums recorded at Van Gelder Studio